James Michael Hussey (27 May 1880 – 24 August 1950) was a New Zealand cricketer. He played first-class cricket for Auckland, Hawke's Bay and Otago between 1901 and 1908.

In Auckland's victory over Hawke's Bay in 1905–06 Hussey top-scored in each innings, making 74 not out and 40 not out. He played for Rangitikei and Wanganui in the Hawke Cup from 1911 to 1924, taking 7 for 24 in the second innings when Wanganui defeated South Auckland to take the trophy for the first time in December 1913.

Hussey worked for the Customs service until 1908 when he went to Wellington to enter the legal profession. He was admitted as a solicitor on 13 March 1908. He practised in Hunterville in the Rangitikei region before moving to Wanganui in 1912.

He died in Wanganui in September 1950, survived by his wife and their two sons and a daughter.

See also
 List of Otago representative cricketers
 List of Auckland representative cricketers

References

External links
 

1880 births
1950 deaths
New Zealand cricketers
20th-century New Zealand lawyers
Auckland cricketers
Hawke's Bay cricketers
Otago cricketers
Cricketers from Dunedin